Kirill Kavokin (born 26 November 1962 in Leningrad) is a Russian physicist working on solid state physics, semiconductor optics and spin physics. He also works on animal vision and magnetoreception. He is currently leading scientist at the Spin Optics Laboratory (SOLAB) at Saint-Petersburg State University (SPbSU) and at the I. M. Sechenov Institute of Evolutionary Physiology and Biochemistry, in Saint Petersburg, Russia. He is the brother of Physicist Alexey Kavokin.

Scientific Career 
 1985: MS in Optoelectronics, Leningrad Electrical Engineering Institute, Leningrad (St.Petersburg), Russia. Thesis title: "Optical study of GaAs-based photocathode structures", under the supervision of Dr. R.I. Dzhioev.
 1985–1987: probation fellow at A.F. Ioffe Physico-Technical Institute.
 1987–1993: Junior researcher at A.F. Ioffe Physico-Technical Institute.
 1993: Ph.D in Physics, A.F. Ioffe Institute. Thesis title: "Theory of Free Magnetic Polarons in Quantum Wells with Semimagnetic Barriers", under the supervision of  Prof. I.A. Merkulov
 1993–1997: Researcher at A.F. Ioffe Physico-Technical Institute.
 1997-2018 Senior scientist at A.F. Ioffe Physico-Technical Institute;  
 2002–2003: Research fellow at School of Physics, University of Exeter, UK.
 2020: Dr. of Science (habilitation), SPbSU. Thesis title: "Relaxation of angular momentum and energy in spin systems of doped semiconductors"

Publications 

He is the author or co-author of over 200 peer-reviewed publications, with key works on spin relaxation in semiconductors, which he studies at both a theoretical and experimental level. He also applied his knowledge of magnetic phenomena in solids to the problem of animal magnetoreception, in particular of garden warblers.

Selected publications:

References 
 
 Kirill Kavokin publications indexed by Publons

Living people
1962 births
Saint Petersburg State Institute of Technology alumni
Russian physicists
Nanophysicists
Optical physicists
Scientists from Saint Petersburg